Awadhe Warriors is a badminton team owned by Sahara Adventure Sports Limited a group company of Sahara India  for the Premier Badminton League (PBL). The team's home ground is Babu Banarasi Das Indoor Stadium, Lucknow. The team is coached by Anup Sridhar.

Awadhe Warriors has La Martiniere Boys' College, Luckow, as its school partner.

Current squad
The squad for 2020 PBL season is:

Indian players
 Ajay Jayaram
 Subhankar Dey
 Tanvi Lad

Overseas players 

 Christinna Pedersen
 Wong Wing Ki
 Ko Sung-hyun
 Shin Baek-cheol
 Beiwen Zhang

2013 Season Squad

Indian players

   P.V. Sindhu (Captain)
  Gurusai Datt
  Kidambi Srikanth
  Ruthvika Shivani
  K. Maneesha
  Nanda Gopal
  Vinay Singh

Foreign players

  Sapsiree Taerattanachai
  Markis Kido
  Chong Wei Feng
  Mathias Boe

2013 season

League matches

Semi final

Final

 Kidambi Srikanth (AW) beat S. Tanongsak (HH) by 21-12, 21-20.
 Saina Nehwal (HH) beat P. V. Sindhu (AW) by 21-15, 21-7.
 Goh V. Shem & Lim Khim Wah (HH) beat Markis Kido & Mathias Boe (AW) by 21-14, 13-21, 11-4.
 Ajay Jayaram (HH) beat Gurusai Datt (AW) by 10-21, 21-17, 11-7.

2016 Season Squad 
Team coach for season 2016 
  Anup Sridhar

Indian players
  Saina Nehwal (Captain)
  Sai Praneeth
  Sourabh Verma
  Vrushali Gummadi
  K. Maneesha

Foreign players
  Cai Yun
  Tanongsak Saensomboonsuk
  Christinna Pedersen
  Hendra Gunawan
  Bodin Issara

2016 season

2017 Season Squad 
Team coach for season 2017 
  Anup Sridhar

Indian players
  Saina Nehwal (Captain)
  Srikanth Kidambi
  Rituparna Das
  Prajakta Sawant
  Aditya Joshi

Foreign players
  Wong Wing Ki
  Bodin Issara
  Goh V Shem
  Markis Kido
  Savitree Amitrapai

2017-18 Season Squad 
Team coach for season 2017-18
  Anup Sridhar

Indian players
  Saina Nehwal (Captain)
  Sai Uttejitha Rao
  Parupalli Kashyap
  Mahima Aggarwal
  Kidambi Srikanth
  Hendra Setiawan
  Harshit Aggarwal

Foreign players
  Christinna Pedersen
  Or Chin Chung
  Tang Chun Man

2018-19 Season Squad  

Team coach for season 2018-19
  Anup Sridhar
 Arun Vishnu (Doubles)

Technical Advisory

 Uttsav Mishra

Indian players
  Ashwini Ponnappa (Captain)
  Sanyogita Ghorpade
  Gurusai Dutt
  Rasika Raje
  Arjun M.R.

Foreign players
  Son Wan-ho (Icon and captain)
  Mathias Christiansen
  Lee Yang
  Zhang Beiwen
  Lee Dong-keun

References

Premier Badminton League teams
Sport in Lucknow
Sahara India Pariwar